SBCT may refer to:

 Stryker Brigade Combat Team, a mechanized infantry force in the U.S. Army
 San Benito County Transit, California, U.S.
 Afonso Pena International Airport (ICAO: SBCT), Curitiba, Brazil,